Wu Sangui (8 June 1612 – 2 October 1678), courtesy name Changbai or Changbo, was a notorious Ming dynasty military officer who played a key role in the fall of the Ming dynasty and the founding of the Qing dynasty in China. In Chinese folklore, Wu Sangui is regarded as a disreputable Han Chinese traitor who played a pivotal role in several historical events, including the Battle of Shanhai Pass, Manchu invasion of China, the suppression of Southern Ming resistances and the execution of the Yongli Emperor, and eventually double-crossed both of his masters, the Ming and the Qing dynasties.

In 1644, after learning of the death of his father, the Ming general Wu Xiang in Beijing, Wu Sangui turned to the Manchu invaders (the Later Jin) and offered up the gate of Shanhaiguan, allowing the Manchus to enter China and establish the Qing dynasty in Beijing. For his aid, the Qing rulers awarded him a fiefdom consisting of Yunnan and Guizhou provinces, and the royal title "Prince Who Pacifies the West".

In 1674, Wu decided to rebel against the Qing. In 1678, Wu declared himself the new Emperor of China and the ruler of Zhou (大周), only to die within months. For a time, his grandson Wu Shifan succeeded him. However, the Kangxi Emperor of the Qing Dynasty eventually quelled the revolt.

Early years
Wu was born in Gaoyou, Jiangsu province, in southeastern China, to Wu Xiang and Lady Zu. His ancestral home was Gaoyou. Wu Sangui's father and uncle had fought in many battles. Under this influence, Wu was shaped by war at an early age and took great interest in war and politics.

In his early years, Wu was a student of the artist Dong Qichang. It was this primarily Confucian education that cultivated Wu's scholarliness, resourcefulness, and imposing appearance.

In 1627, the Chongzhen Emperor decided to reinstate the imperial examination system on his accession to the throne, and Wu became a first-degree military scholar (juren) at the age of fifteen. He and his two brothers joined the army and served as generals garrisoning the Daling River and Ningyuan in the army of general Zu Dashou.

In 1630, while gathering information about the enemy, Wu's father, Wu Xiang, was encircled by tens of thousands of Qing troops. Wu was denied help from his maternal uncle, Zu Dashou, and so decided to rescue his father with a force of about 20 soldiers chosen from his personal retinue. The Manchus being bewildered by the small Ming cavalry force, Wu Sangui and his men charged into the enemy encirclement, killed the Manchu general and saved Wu Xiang. Both Hong Taiji and Zu Dashou were impressed by Wu's valour, and Zu Dashou recommended Wu's promotion. Wu Sangui gained the position of guerrilla general when he was no older than 20.

Service under the Ming dynasty

Garrisoning Liaodong 
In 1632, the Ming court transferred the Liaodong army to Shandong, to defeat the rebel armies of Kong Youde. Wu, who was 22 years old at that time, served as a guerrilla general and fought side by side with his father, Wu Xiang. Wu rose to the rank of deputy general and was promoted to full general in September of that year. In September 1638, Wu served as a deputy general again.

At the beginning of 1639, as the situation in Liaodong became increasingly tense, the Ming court transferred general Hong Chengchou as the governor-general of Jiliao; Hong appointed Wu as the general in charge of training.

In October 1639, a Qing army of more than 10,000 men, commanded by Duoduo and Haoge, invaded Ningyuan. Jin Guofeng, full general of Ningyuan, immediately led troops to confront the Qing army but was surrounded and killed. Wu took Jin's place as full general of Ningyuan, and became a guardian general of Liaodong.

After Wu served as the full general in Ningyuan, he made the local army the strongest in Liaodong, having 20,000 troops at Ningyuan town. To enhance their combat power, Wu selected 1,000 elite soldiers to form a fearless battalion. The battalion was trained and commanded by Wu himself, making these men his bodyguard who would come at Wu's call at any time. They were the core of his army and laid the foundation for Wu's military achievements.

In March 1640, Hong Taiji appointed Jirgalang and Duoduo as left and right commander, respectively, marching towards the north of Jinzhou.  Aiming to besiege Jinzhou, they reestablished Yizhou, garrisoned the troops, opened up wasteland, grew food grain, and forbade any cultivation in the Ningjin area outside Shanhai Pass.

Battle of Xingshan 
On 18 May 1640, Wu Sangui met the Qing army in battle at Xingshan. Jirgalang led 1,500 soldiers to accept the surrender of the Mongolian people, but they were spotted by general Liu Zhaoji when passing the Ming army. Liu Zhaoji led 3,000 soldiers against the Qing army. At that time, Wu Sangui was stationed in Songshan and brought a 3,000-strong force the moment he heard the news. From Jinzhou, Zu Dashou sent more than 700 soldiers as a reserve. At first, the Ming army seemed more powerful with superior numbers; but, after the pursuit of Jiamashan, the Qing army was able to surround Wu Sangui.

Wu Sangui was unable to withstand the repeated attacks from both Jirgalang and Duoduo. He fought a bloody battle with the Qing army, but could not break through the siege until Liu Zhaoji came to his rescue. The Ming army casualties were more than 1000, with deputy general Yanglun and Zhou Yanzhou dead, but Wu Sangui's bravery was still praised.

Battle of Songjin 
On 25 April 1641, the battle of Songjin began with an attack by the Ming army, Wu Sangui leading and personally killing ten enemies, defeating the Qing cavalry. After the battle, Wu Sangui was regarded as its most outstanding general.

In June 1641, Hong Chengchou and Wu Sangui returned to Songshan and garrisoned the northwest area. Prince Zheng Jirgalang attacked several times towards Songshan and Xinshan but was defeated repeatedly, the Ming army succeeding in surrounding the Qing army four times. Though the Qing army finally broke through the encirclement, their casualties were very high. Due to Wu Sangui's bravery, the Ming army remained on the offensive, but it also paid a heavy price.

On 20 August 1641, the Ming army attacked the Qing camp. The battle lasted the whole day, and the result was too close to call. However, Prince Ajige unexpectedly captured the Ming army's provisions in Bijia Mountain, significantly undermining their ability to fight. The battle continued on 21 August, and was unfavourable to the Ming army. After this defeat Datong full general Wang Pu lost the will to fight. Before Hong Chengchou issued orders, Wang fled with his troops, which completely disrupted the original breakthrough plan. More surprisingly, Wu Sangui also fled in the chaos, escaping on Wang's heel. At such a life-or-death moment, Wu revealed selfishness.

The Ming army attempted to withdraw, pursued by the Qing. In a matter of a few days, more than 53,000 people and 7,400 horses of the Ming army were killed. They had no way to flee and no will to fight. Only 30,000 survived after fleeing back to Ningyuan.

Wu Sangui survived not only by following Wang Pu, but by having a good retreat plan. When Hong Chengchou ordered the breakthrough, Wu Sangui went back to his camp and immediately discussed tactics with his generals. They decided to give up the small path and flee on the main road. As expected, the Qing army had only cut off the small path, while no more than 400 soldiers held the main road under Hong Taiji. Seeing Wu Sangui's fierce charge, Hong Taiji restrained his army from pursuing. Hong thought highly of Wu, and considered gaining his favor as the key to conquering the dynasty.

The breakthrough at Songshan resulted in the deaths of 52,000 members of the Ming elite army, which greatly wounded the Ming dynasty. Wu and Wang Pu could not escape the fate of being punished for fleeing and avoiding combat and were sentenced to death.

Promotion after the defeat 
A few days later, Wu, who had fled to Ningyuan, received the imperial decree of the Chongzhen emperor. Surprisingly, Wu was promoted above all the full generals. This implied that Wu would not be punished, which was beyond the comprehension of many government officials. Even more surprising was the fact that, months later, when someone in the court called for an investigation to determine responsibility for the Songshan defeat, only Wang Pu was arrested while Wu continued to serve as a governor general of Liaodong, garrisoned in Ningyuan. This caused an outcry in the Ming court.

In May 1642, the result of the Ming court's re-examination was the death penalty for Wang Pu, and demotion of three levels in rank for Wu. Wu continued to serve as full general in Ningyuan and was in charge of the training of the Liaodong army.

Defection to the Qing

Surrender to the Qing dynasty 
By February 1642, the Ming Dynasty had lost four of the eight vital cities beyond the Shanhaiguan Pass to the Manchu army. Ningyuan, where Wu was stationed, became Beijing's last defence against the Manchu army. Hong Taiji repeatedly attempted to persuade Wu to surrender, to no avail. Wu did not side with the Qing Dynasty until after the defensive capability of the Ming Dynasty had been greatly weakened with its political apparatus destroyed by the rebel armies of Li Zicheng's Shun dynasty.

In early 1644, Li Zicheng, the head of a peasant rebel army, launched his force from Xi'an for his final offensive northeast toward Beijing. The Chongzhen Emperor decided to abandon Ningyuan and called upon Wu to defend Beijing against the rebels. Wu Sangui received the title Pingxi Bo as he moved to face the peasant army.

At the time of Beijing's fall to Li Zicheng, on 25 April 1644, Wu and his 40,000-man army—the most significant Ming fighting force in northern China—were on the way to Beijing to come to the Chongzhen Emperor's aid but then received word of the emperor's suicide. So they garrisoned the Shanhai Pass, the eastern terminus of the main Great Wall instead. Wu and his men were then caught between the rebels within the Great Wall and the Manchus without.

After the collapse of the Ming dynasty, Wu and his army became a vital military force in deciding the fate of China. Both Dorgon and Li Zicheng tried to gain Wu's support. Li Zicheng took a number of measures to secure Wu's surrender, granting silver, gold, a dukedom, and most crucially by capturing Wu's father Wu Xiang, ordering the latter to write a letter to persuade Wu to pledge allegiance to Li.

At first, Wu intended to surrender to Li Zicheng, but when he heard of the predatory behaviour of Li's army and his father's captivity, he changed his plans. Instead, he killed Li's envoy. To save the life of his family, he wrote back to his father scolding him for his disloyalty and claiming to be breaking relations with his father. Furthermore, he sent several generals to pretend to pledge allegiance to Li. He knew that his force alone was insufficient to fight Li's main army. He wrote to Dorgon for military support, under the condition of restricting the dominance of Ming and Manchus to southern and northern China, respectively, claiming to resume the Ming Dynasty. The Manchu prince-regent Dorgon determined that this was an opportunity to claim the Mandate of Heaven for the Qing. Dorgon made clear in his reply that the Manchus would help Wu, but Wu would have to submit to the Qing. Wu did not accept at first.

Li Zicheng sent two armies to attack the pass, but Wu's battle-hardened troops defeated them easily on 5 and 10 May 1644. In order to secure his position, Li was determined to destroy Wu's army. On 18 May, he personally led 60,000 troops out of Beijing to attack Wu. and defeated Wu on 21 May. The next day, Wu wrote to Dorgon for help. Dorgon took the opportunity to force Wu to surrender, and Wu had little choice but to accept. On 22 May 1644, Wu opened the gates of the Great Wall of China at Shanhai Pass to let Qing forces into China proper, forming an alliance with the Manchus. Wu ordered his soldiers to wear white cloths attached to their armour, to distinguish them from Li Zicheng's forces. Together, Wu's army and the Qing forces defeated the Shun rebels in the Battle of Shanhai Pass on 27 May 1644. Having defeated Li's main army, the Qing marched into Beijing unopposed and enthroned the young Shunzhi Emperor in the Forbidden City.  Wu pledged allegiance to the Qing dynasty.

Suppressing the rebellion in Shanxi 

Wu Sangui surrendered to the Qing dynasty and received the title of Pingxi Wang. However, he remained fearful that the Qing dynasty held him in suspicion.

In October 1644, Wu received orders to suppress the rebel peasant army. At that time, Li Zicheng still held Shanxi, Hubei, Henan, and other areas, and was gathering his troops to rise again. Wu, together with Shang Kexi, led his soldiers to Shanxi against the rebel army under Ajige, the General of Jingyuan appointed by the prince regent Dorgon. From October to the following August, when he returned to Beijing, Wu fought the peasant army and achieved great success.

Li Zicheng held a grudge against Wu for his faithlessness, so he executed thirty-eight members of the Wu household, including Wu's father, whose head was displayed on the city wall. Enraged, Wu hardened his resolve to resist the new regime and defeated the Shun vanguard led by Tang Tong on 3 and 10 May.  In June 1645, Wu Sangui captured Yulin and Yan'an. At the same time Li Zicheng was killed by a village head in Tongshan county, Hubei Province.

In 1645, the Qing court rewarded Wu Sangui with the title of Qin Wang and ordered him to garrison Jinzhou. The high-sounding title was belied by transferring Wu to Jinzhou, which had lost its position as a militarily important town and become an insignificant rear area. Moreover, along with a large number of Manchu and Han people migrating into central China, it had become sparsely populated and desolate. Hence, Wu felt perplexed and upset.

On 19 August 1645, before Wu returned to Liaodong from Beijing, he submitted his request to the Qing imperial court to renounce his title as Qin Wang (Prince). After giving up his title, he began to make efforts to consolidate his strength by demanding troops, territory, compensation, and reward for the generals under his command, which were all granted by the imperial court.

In July 1646, when Wu Sangui was summoned by the emperor, the Qing court granted him a total of 10 horses and 20,000 pieces of silver as an extra reward. Wu wasn't pleased, however, since he had been set aside since his return to Jinzhou, while the army of Kong Youde, Geng Jingzhong, and Shang Kexi had been fighting against the South Ming Dynasty in Hunan and Guangxi since 1646.

Suppressing the rebellion in Sichuan 
In 1648, the rebellion against the Qing dynasty reached its climax. In the west, Jiang Xiang, the full general of Datong, waged an insurgency in Shanxi, while, in the south, in Nanchang and Guangzhou, Jin Shenghuan and Li Chengdong also rebelled, which dramatically changed the military situation.

The rebellion from the surrendered Han generals greatly shocked the Qing dynasty rulers. They came to realize the significant role of these conquered generals to the control of central China, as well as the importance of the strategy of "using Han to rule Han" (以汉制汉). In this situation, Wu thrived again.

At the beginning of 1648, the Qing imperial court ordered Wu to move his family west and garrison Hanzhong as Pingxi Wang with Chief General (Du Tong) of the Eight Banners Moergen and Li Weihan. In less than one year, Wu suppressed the rebellion in most regions of Shanxi and reversed the situation in the northwest. After that, Wu, charging at the head of his troops in every battle, proved his loyalty to the Qing dynasty. After four years of struggle, peace came to Shaanxi province. Wu was praised for his contribution by the Qing imperial court, and his status rose.

In 1652, the rebel Daxi army became the main force rebelling against the Qing. The situation was made difficult by the deaths of the Qing generals Kong Youde and Ni Kan, when the rebels Li Dingguo and Liu Wenxiu's troops marched into Sichuan. The Qing imperial court then summoned Wu to suppress the Daxi army in Sichuan. However, Wu Sangui was being closely watched by general Li Guohan, a trusted advisor to the imperial court. Wu wasn't able to free himself from surveillance until a few years later, when Li Guohan died. Hence, Wu enhanced his military strength rapidly by gaining a large number of enemy surrenders.

Garrisoning Yunnan 
In 1660, the Qing army split into three parts, marched into Yunnan province, and eliminated the South Ming Dynasty, thus achieving the preliminary unification of the mainland. Nevertheless, the imperial court still faced a number of serious military and political threats. The Yongli Emperor of the Southern Ming dynasty and Li Dingguo of the Daxi army retreated to Burma, and they maintained influence in Yunnan. It was inconvenient for the Eight Banners soldiers to garrison the Yunnan Guizhou border area, which was far away from the capital. As a result, the imperial court could only approve the proposal by Hong Chengchou to withdraw those soldiers, and give Wu, and his army, command of the border area. Thus, Wu not only commanded a large army but also controlled vast territory.

In 1661, the green-flag army under Wu numbered 60,000, while Shang Kexi and Geng Jimao had only 7,500 ad 7,000 soldiers in their armies. Wu planned to permanently garrison and was preparing to make the border area his own. However, Yunnan was not stable at that time, for newly surrendered soldiers had not been fully assimilated into the Qing force. Moreover, the Daxi army had been building in Yunnan over decades and shared a close relationship with various minority nationalities. Many Tusi leaders refused to accept the rule of Wu, which led to a series of rebellions. The existence of the Yongli Emperor of the Southern Ming dynasty and Li Dingguo's army was regarded as a great threat to Wu. Therefore, Wu was actively preparing for their elimination to consolidate his rule. He exaggerated the rebellion's threat, spread rumors and submitted his proposal to the court, urging the invasion of Burma, which, after a time, the imperial court approved.

In June 1662, the Yongli Emperor was captured and killed, while Li Dingguo died of illness. In the next few years, Wu led his army from the northwest to the southwest border and enabled the Qing dynasty's dominance in that part of the country.

Loyalty and revolt

After he defeated the remnant Ming forces in southwestern China, Wu was rewarded by the Qing imperial court with the title of Pingxi Wang (平西王; translated as "Prince Who Pacifies the West" or "King Who Pacifies the West") with a fief in Yunnan. It had been extremely rare for someone outside of the imperial clan, especially a non-Manchu, to be granted the title of Wang. Those who were not members of the imperial clan and awarded the title were called Yixing Wang ( literally meaning "kings with other family names") or known as "vassal kings". These vassal kings usually came to a bad end, mainly because they were not trusted by the emperors.

At the end of 1662, Guizhou province came under the jurisdiction of Wu. Meanwhile, Wu's son, Wu Yingxiong (Wu Shifan's father), married Princess Jianning, the 14th daughter of the Kangxi Emperor's grandfather Hong Taiji. She was Fulin's (the Shunzhi Emperor's) sister.

The Qing imperial court did not trust Wu, but he was still able to rule Yunnan with little or no interference. This was because the Manchus, an ethnic minority, needed time after their prolonged conquest to figure out how to impose the rule of a dynasty of a tiny minority on the vast Han-Chinese society. As a semi-independent ruler in the distant southwest, Wu was seen as an asset to the Qing court. For much of his rule, he received massive annual subsidies from the central government. This money, as well as the long period of stability, was spent by Wu in building his army, in preparation for an eventual clash with the Qing dynasty.

Wu in Yunnan, along with Shang Kexi in Guangdong and Geng Jingzhong in Fujian—the three great Han military allies of the Manchus, who had pursued the rebels and the Southern Ming pretenders—became a financial burden on the central government. Their virtually autonomous control of large areas threatened the stability of the Qing dynasty. The Kangxi Emperor decided to make Wu and two other princes who had been rewarded with large fiefs in southern and western China move from their lands to resettle in Manchuria. In 1673, Shang Kexi requested permission to retire and return to his homeland in the north, and the Kangxi Emperor granted the request at once. Forced into an awkward situation, Wu and Geng Jingzhong requested the same shortly afterwards. The Kangxi Emperor granted their requests and decided to dissolve the three vassal states, overriding all objections.

Driven by the threat to their interests, the three revolted and thus began the eight-year-long civil war known as the Revolt of the Three Feudatories. Before the rebellion, Wu sent a confidant to Beijing to retrieve Wu Yingxiong, his son and the young emperor's uncle-in-law; but his son disagreed. The confidant only brought back Wu Shipan, Wu Yingxiong's son by a concubine. On 28 December 1673, Wu killed Zhu Guozhi, the governor of Yunnan, and rebelled "against the alien and rebuilding Ming dynasty". On 7 January 1674, 62-year-old Wu led troops from Yunnan on the northern expedition and took the whole territory of Guizhou province without any loss. Wu Yingxiong and his sons with Princess Jianning was executed by the Kangxi Emperor soon after his father's rebellion. Shortly afterwards, Wu founded his own Zhou dynasty. By April 1674, Wu Sangui's army had quickly occupied Hunan, Hubei, Sichuan, and Guangxi. In the next 2 years, Geng Jingzhong, Wang Fuchen, and Shang Zhixin successively rose in rebellion, and Wu's rebellion had expanded into the Revolt of the Three Feudatories. By April 1676, the rebel force possessed 11 provinces (Yunnan, Guizhou, Sichuan, Shanxi, Gansu, Hunan, Guangdong, Guangxi, Fujian, Zhejiang, and Jiangxi). For a moment, the situation seemed to favor Wu.

Unexpectedly, Wu halted his march and stayed south of Yangzi river for three months because of a shortage of troops and financial resources, which gave the Kangxi emperor a chance to assemble his forces. Wang Fuchen, Geng Jingzhong, and Shang Zhixin surrendered one after another under the attack of Qing forces.

In 1678, Wu Sangui went a step further and declared himself the emperor of the "Great Zhou", with the era name of Zhaowu (昭武). He established his capital at Hengzhou (present-day Hengyang, Hunan). When he died in October 1678, his grandson, Wu Shifan, took over command of his forces and continued the struggle. The remnants of Wu's armies were defeated soon after, in December 1681, and Wu Shifan committed suicide. Wu's son-in-law was sent to Beijing with Wu Shifan's head. The Kangxi Emperor sent parts of Wu's corpse to various provinces of China.

Zhou dynasty (1678–1681)

Family 
Brothers:
Wu Sanfeng (吳三鳳)
Wu Sanfu (吳三輔)
Wu Sanmei (吳三枚)

Consorts and Issue:
Empress Zhang, of the Zhang clan (皇后 張氏, 1615 – 1699)
Wu Yingxiong (吳應熊), first son
Concubine Chen, of the Chen clan (妾陳氏), personal name Yuanyuan (圓圓)
Unknown:
6 daughters
Adopted son: Wu Yingqi

Physical appearance
Late Ming dynasty historians left behind records describing Wu Sangui as a valiant and handsome general of medium height, with pale skin, a straight nose, and big ears. However, there was an obvious scar on his nose. He was neither muscular nor particularly strong-looking. However, he demonstrated great courage and physical strength from an early age and possessed excellent skills in horse-riding and archery.

In popular culture
In contemporary China, Wu Sangui has often been regarded as a traitor and an opportunist, due to his betrayal of both the Ming and Qing dynasties. Wu's name is synonymous with betrayal (similar to the use of "Benedict Arnold" in the United States). However, more sympathetic characterizations are sometimes voiced, and it is clear that Wu's romance with and love for his concubine, Chen Yuanyuan, remains one of the classic love stories in Chinese history.

Wu Sangui appears as an antagonist in the wuxia novel The Deer and the Cauldron by Jin Yong. In the novel, the Kangxi Emperor sent the protagonist Wei Xiaobao to Yunnan to meet Wu Sangui and assess his intentions after receiving intelligence that Wu Sangui was plotting a rebellion.

Wu's early life and military career are portrayed in a more positive light in the 2003 CCTV television series The Affaire in the Swing Age, in which he is shown as being forced into making the fateful decisions that have made him infamous.

See also
 Ming–Qing transition
 Royal and noble ranks of the Qing dynasty

References

Sources
. In two volumes.

1612 births
1678 deaths
Chinese emperors
Generals from Liaoning
Great Wall of China
Ming dynasty generals
Founding monarchs
Qing dynasty rebels
Posthumous executions